Thomas George Hupke (December 29, 1910 – September 8, 1959) was an American football player. He played college football at the University of Alabama from 1930 to 1933 and was selected as an All-American in 1933.  During the four years Hupke played for the Crimson Tide, the team compiled a record of 34–4–1.  He subsequently played professional football for six years with the Detroit Lions (1934–1937) and the Cleveland Rams (1938–1939).  He was a member of the 1935 Detroit Lions team that won the 1935 NFL Championship Game.  In September 1959, Hupke died in Detroit at age 48 after a long illness.

See also
 1932 College Football All-America Team
 1933 College Football All-America Team
 List of Alabama Crimson Tide football All-Americans

References

1910 births
1959 deaths
Sportspeople from East Chicago, Indiana
Players of American football from Indiana
American football guards
Alabama Crimson Tide football players
Cleveland Rams players
Detroit Lions players
All-American college football players
All-Southern college football players